Perak F.C. II played the 2021 season in the Malaysia Premier League.

Events
On 1 May 2021, Azman Noh has been appointed as club's team manager.

On 30 May 2021, club's team manager, Azman Noh tendered his resignation effective 1 June 2021.

On 16 July 2021, the club draw 1–1 against Kelantan in a league match.

On 28 July 2021, the club has lost 0–4 against Kelantan United during league match.

On 4 August 2021, the club suffered 2-0 lost against Johor Darul Ta'zim II in a league match.

On 15 August 2021, the club has been defeated 1–4 to Sarawak United.

On 22 August 2021, the club has been defeated 0–3 in league match.

Competitions

Malaysia Premier League

League table

Squad statistics

References

Perak F.C. II seasons
Perak II